HMCS Kapuskasing was an  that served in the Royal Canadian Navy during the Second World War. The vessel was primarily used as a convoy escort in the Battle of the Atlantic. Following the war she saw service as a hydrographic survey ship with the Department of Mines. She was named for Kapuskasing, Ontario.

Design and description
The ships' complement consisted of 85 officers and ratings.

The reciprocating ships had two vertical triple-expansion steam engines, each driving one shaft, using steam provided by two Admiralty three-drum boilers.

The Algerine class was armed with a QF  Mk V anti-aircraft gun and four twin-gun mounts for Oerlikon 20 mm cannon. The latter guns were in short supply when the first ships were being completed and they often got a proportion of single mounts. By 1944, single-barrel Bofors 40 mm mounts began replacing the twin 20 mm mounts on a one for one basis. All of the ships were fitted for four throwers and two rails for depth charges. Many Canadian ships omitted their sweeping gear in exchange for a 24-barrel Hedgehog spigot mortar and a stowage capacity for 90+ depth charges.

Construction and career
Kapuskasing was ordered on 12 December 1941. The ship was laid down on 19 December 1942 by Port Arthur Shipbuilding Co. Ltd. at Port Arthur, Ontario and launched 22 July 1943. The vessel was commissioned into the Royal Canadian Navy on 17 August 1944 at Port Arthur, with the pennant J326.

After commissioning, Kapuskasing was sent to Bermuda to work up. Upon the vessel's return to Canadian waters, she was assigned to the Western Escort Force as Senior Officer's Ship of escort group W-1.  As Senior Officer Ship, the commander of the escort would be aboard her during convoy missions. Primarily used as a convoy escort, the ship remained with the group until the end of hostilities in the Atlantic Ocean. The group was disbanded in June 1945 and she was placed in maintenance reserve at Sydney, Nova Scotia.

In November 1945, Kapuskasing underwent a refit at Halifax and upon its completion, was paid off into the reserve on 27 March 1946.

In 1949, Kapuskasing was recommissioned and was assigned pennant 171. The vessel was loaned to the Department of Mines and Technical Surveys for use as a hydrographic survey platform. The ship was returned to the Royal Canadian Navy in 1972. On 3 October 1978, she was taken to sea and sunk as a naval target.

See also
 List of ships of the Canadian Navy

Notes

References
 
 
 
 
 
 

 

Algerine-class minesweepers of the Royal Canadian Navy
Ships built in Ontario
1943 ships
World War II minesweepers of Canada
World War II escort ships of Canada
Cold War minesweepers of Canada
Maritime incidents in 1978
Ships sunk as targets